The GT World Challenge America is a North American auto racing series launched in 1990 by the Sports Car Club of America. It has been managed by the Stephane Ratel Organisation since 2018, and has been sanctioned by the United States Auto Club since 2017.

The series consists of four driver classifications and five classes of vehicles: GT3, GT4, (Sprint, SprintX, East and West), and Touring Car, consisting of TCR homologated cars, as well as separate TC and TCA  classes featuring modified production vehicles, such as the BMW M235iR and the Mazda MX-5 Cup car.

History
The Sports Car Club of America created a "showroom stock" class for amateur club racing in 1972. In 1984, following the success of the Longest Day of Nelson and another 24-hour race at Mid-Ohio, the SCCA combined existing races into a manufacturer's championship. For 1985, the series became a 6-race professional championship with sponsorship from Playboy magazine. Escort radar detectors sponsored the series from 1986 until 1991.

In 1990, the series was officially named World Challenge and was restructured to adopt rules similar to the European Group A for homologated production cars. The higher-cost "sports" classes were dropped after 1996, leaving the class format as it would stand until 2010. Speed TV network began sponsoring the series in 1999. With fields growing, the series began separate races for the GT and Touring classes in 2000, which would remain until 2010. In 2010, the series moved away from the partnership with SPEED, and signed a broadcast partnership with Versus (now NBCSN) for coverage. The series moved existing touring cars into a new GTS class, while changing the rules for the touring car class to reduce costs and keep cars closer to stock.

With the SpeedVision television contract, the World Challenge eventually succeeded Trans Am as the SCCA's premier series.

In July 2008, the World Challenge series was purchased by WC Vision, a group of investors. The Sports Car Club of America remained the sanctioning partner of the series.

Starting with the 2011 season, the series signed a partnership with Pirelli and the leading tire manufacturer became the official tire supplier and title sponsor of the series.

In 2014, the Pirelli World Challenge established a GT-A classification similar to the FIA's bronze category.

In 2015, the series established GT Cup, featuring Porsche 991 Cup Cars that ran as part of the overall GT class races. Also, CBS Sports Network and Motor Trend On Demand became the new television partners.

In 2016, the series established SprintX classes of racing featuring two-driver sprint races for several driver classes. As part of the partnership with the SRO, the GTS class was expanded to include GT4 homologations.

For 2017, the Pirelli World Challenge transferred to USAC as its sanctioning body. GT Cup class is expanding to include Cup cars from Lamborghini and Ferrari, while SprintX classes expand in both driver classification specificity and competition-legal platforms.

On May 25, 2018, it was announced that the Stéphane Ratel Organisation had become majority shareholder of WC Vision LLC, and thus majority owner of Pirelli World Challenge.

On September 29, 2018, it was announced the series acquired a new title sponsor as part of the overhaul of the Ratel series.  The GT Sprint Cup in Europe and GT Series Asia will now be known as the Blancpain GT World Challenge Europe and Asia, respectively.  The current World Challenge will become World Challenge America.

Format

Each season consists of upwards of 11 event weekends and between 5 and 16 rounds or races. Some rounds or races use a standing start, as opposed to the all rolling starts seen in other sports car racing series. Blancpain GT World Challenge races consist of two-driver, 90-minute SprintX format races with two races per weekend. GT4 America is divided into two race formats, single driver, 50-minute Sprint races and two-driver 60-minute Sprintx races. The Touring Car America championship involve separate TCR 40-minute sprint races and 40-minute TC & TCA races.

Blancpain GT World Challenge America

The allowed body styles within this class are coupe, sedan and convertible. The cars permitted in GT are typically sold in the market as “sports” cars, “sport-touring” cars, or performance versions of “luxury” cars. Forced induction is permitted on cars that come equipped with forced induction stock, or on cars that the series has determined need help reaching the target horsepower range. Power output ranges from 500 hp to 600 hp. Weight varies depending on power output and tire size. All of the vehicles in GT are rear-wheel drive, or all-wheel drive. FIA GT3 class cars are now approved to compete in the class starting in 2013.

Pirelli GT4 America

The allowed body styles within this class are coupe, sedan and convertible. The cars permitted in GTS are typically marketed as “sports cars”, “sport-touring cars” or performance versions of “luxury” cars but at a lower permissible preparation level than GT. Forced induction is permitted on cars that come equipped with forced induction stock. Power output ranges from 300-400 hp. Weight varies depending on power output and tire size. Front-wheel, rear-wheel, and all-wheel drive configurations are permitted.  As of 2017, the class rules fully mimic the FIA GT4 formula.  Models include the Ford Mustang, Chevrolet Camaro, Acura TSX, Audi TT, Porsche Cayman, Kia Optima, Nissan 370Z and Scion FR-S.

SprintX
In 2016 an extended sprint format series was added as a standalone championship in addition to its existing Sprint format racing series. SprintX races are 60 minutes in length and feature mandatory driver and tire changes.

GT4 East & GT4 West
Beginning in 2019, GT4 America began two regional series integrated into its Sprint X Championship. The regional series consist of five rounds each in the eastern and western sides of North America in a two-driver, pro-am format.

TC America

Touring Car (TC)
The allowed body styles in this class are coupes, hatchbacks, wagons, sedans. Power output ranges from approximately 300 hp. Weight varies depending on the power output of the individual drivetrain configurations. Front-wheel, rear-wheel, and all-wheel drive configurations are permitted. Forced induction may be allowed on cars that have forced induction systems available from the manufacturer which do not void the factory warranties.

Touring Car A (TCA)
Established in 2014, this class is an evolution of the current TC class with an emphasis on maintaining cost effectiveness while providing an easy avenue to entry into professional racing. Performance modifications will be limited to mainly chassis tuning. Front wheel and rear wheel drive configurations are permitted. Target power output is 220 crank hp from non-modified stock engines. Forced induction maybe allowed on cars that have forced induction systems available from the manufacturer as a stock engine option. Examples of eligible cars include the Honda Civic SI, Mazda MX-5, Ford Focus, Scion FR-S and Kia Forte.

Former Classes

TCR Touring Car (TCR)
The TCR class is based on the international TCR Touring Car class employed by a multitude of series worldwide. All TCR cars are based on 4 or 5 door production vehicles, and are powered by 2.0 litre turbocharged engines. While the bodyshell and suspension layout of the production vehicle is retained in a TCR car, and many models use a production gearbox, certain accommodations are made for the stresses of the racetrack including upgraded brakes and aerodynamics. Competition vehicles are subject to Balance of Performance (or BoP) adjustments to ensure close racing between different vehicles.

GTA 
A "GTA" ("GT Amateur") driver class debuted in 2014. It was a designation to recognize gentlemen drivers that competed in the GT class.

GT Cup 
This spec class debuted in 2015 featuring Porsche 991 Cup Cars that ran as part of the overall GT Class races, with a separate victory circle presentation alongside that of the GT/GT-A class winners. In 2017 the class was expanded to include Lamborghini Huracan Super Trofeo and Ferrari 488 Challenge cars.

Touring Car B-Spec 
Based on the Sports Car Club of America class of the same name, these were smaller cars with small, efficient, naturally aspirated motors (target HP is 125). Modifications were limited to manufacturer specified performance spring and shocks to keep overall cost down. Cars competing in TCB were prepared to the SCCA Club Racing B Spec rules. Cars that were eligible included the Fiat 500, Ford Fiesta, Mazda 2, Mini Cooper, Chevrolet Sonic, Honda Fit, Kia Rio, and Nissan Versa.
The class was discontinued after the 2017 season, a year after sanctioning of the series changed from SCCA to USAC.  These cars are still eligible to participate in the SCCA Runoffs.

Older World Challenge cars
Starting in 2009, older World Challenge cars became eligible (with minor modifications) for competition in SCCA racing. Under the SCCA's General Competition Rules (GCR), the Super Touring category allows World Challenge GTs to compete in STO and Touring cars to compete in STU. In 2013 the STO class was merged into the T1 and GT2 classes.

Circuits

Television

Speed TV network televised the World Challenge starting in 1996, with the series being called the SPEED World Challenge until 2010.

Near the end of the broadcast partnership with SPEED, the World Challenge had been broadcast on weekdays as opposed to the traditional weekends. For 2009, the races were combined into an hour-long block.

On January 4, 2010, Versus (now NBC Sports Network) announced they would televise 90-minute broadcasts beginning in the 2010 season. Each broadcast featured all the races from each round. The entire 2010 season was shown on the channel. The series later returned to weekend telecasts.

Starting in 2015, CBS Sports Network announced that it acquired television rights to the series. Torque.TV, later Motor Trend On Demand partnered with CBS Sports Network for the race broadcasts to stream all races live on their website as well as on World-ChallengeTV.com . CBS Sports Network will have at least 1 race with live television coverage with Detroit being the first round announced to have live coverage.

The series has also established a section on its official site where fans can watch archived race and in-car video, as well as an increasing amount of archived television broadcasts of events prior to the 2016 season. The website currently has coverage from as far back as 2008.

Tyres
On October 4, 2010, the series announced that Pirelli would replace longtime partner Toyo Tires as the exclusive tyre supplier for the series. For the first time in series history, teams competed on racing slicks (Pirelli P Zero) rather than the DOT competition tyres in use for much of its history. In January 2014, Pirelli Tire North America and WC Vision extended the partnership for an additional five years. The extension of the partnership between the tyre brand and the top production car-based racing series will run through the 2018 season.

Champions

Source:
From 1986 to 1989 the series consisted of endurance races where co-drivers were used, often resulting in co-champions.
From 1986 to 1996 a variety of prior classification systems were used. Class winners are placed under the heading (GT or TC) of the most similar modern class.

Manufacturers' Champions

See also
 Blancpain GT World Challenge Europe
 Blancpain GT World Challenge Asia
 Blancpain Endurance Series
 Intercontinental GT Challenge
 WeatherTech SportsCar Championship
 Michelin Pilot Challenge
 Canadian Touring Car Championship
 British Touring Car Championship
 British GT Championship
 944 Cup

References

External links
Blancpain GT World Challenge America Official Website
GT4 America Official Website
TC America Official Website

 
Sports car racing series
Auto racing series in the United States
Auto racing series in Canada
SCCA Pro Racing
World Challenge
Group GT3